Tiffany Christine Bias (born May 22, 1992) is an American-Thai professional basketball player who last played for the New York Liberty of the Women's National Basketball Association (WNBA). She was selected in the second round of the 2014 WNBA Draft, 17th overall.

High school career 
Bias attended Andover Central High School where she was a multiple sport athlete. During her sophomore year she led the girls basketball team to a 26–0 record, along with a Class 4A state title. In her junior year Tiffany set the state tournament scoring record with 89 points, while helped her team to a third-place finish tournament. In her senior year Bias once again led her team to another state title, this time finishing with a 25–0 record. Bias was a three-year captain for the girls basketball team. She was also named to the first team Kansas Basketball Coaches Association All State Team as a sophomore, junior and senior. Bias received the prestigious Gatorade Girl Basketball Player of the Year Award after her senior season. She finished her high school career with 1,780 points, 452 steals, and 592 assist while helping Central to a 91–8 record. Bias also played volleyball and ran track for three years at Central. She was a two-time state champion in the 200 meters and a three-time state champion in the 400 meters.

College career
Bias accepted a scholarship to play for the Cowgirls at Oklahoma State University. Bias was also considering scholarships from Kansas, Kansas State, Colorado, Missouri, UCLA, UTEP, LSU, and Arizona. Bias played four years of basketball at Oklahoma State University. She was recognized for her defense and her ability to record assists. In her freshman year Bias started in 31 of 32 games and finished the season with 135 assists, which was good enough for second most assist by a freshman Oklahoma State University player. In her sophomore year Bias was named to the second-team All-Big 12 team in just her second year. She finished the season with 229 assists, which shattered the single season assist record for any OSU player. Bias was also finished ranked seventh in the nation in assists. In her junior season she was once again named to the second-team All-Big 12 team along with an honorable mention for the All-American team. On February 2 against Baylor Bias become only the 20th Cowgirl to score 1,000 career points and only the 2nd Cowgirl with 500 career assists. In her senior year she led the Cowgirls to the sweet sixteen for only the third time in school history. Bias was named to the All-Big 12 First team, as she led the conference in minutes played. She also finished second in the conference in both steals and assists, along with a tenth-place finish in points.

Oklahoma State statistics
Source

Professional career

WNBA
Bias was selected in the second round (17th Overall) of the 2014 WNBA Draft by the Phoenix Mercury. Bias received limited playing time in her first year as she averaged 4.0 minutes played per game and 1.1 points per game. Playing alongside Brittney Griner, Diana Taurasi and Candice Dupree, Bias and the Mercury would post a 29–5 record (most wins in WNBA history) and would eventually win the 2014 WNBA championship after sweeping the Chicago Sky in the finals. After two seasons played with the Mercury, she was waived by the team in 2016. She would then sign with the Seattle Storm but would be waived days later before the start of the season. Midway through the 2016 season, Bias signed a 7-day contract with the Dallas Wings. Bias would then re-sign with the Wings for the remainder of the season after her 7-day contract expired. In February 2017, Bias re-signed with the Wings to a one-year deal in free agency. In May 2017, Bias was waived by the Wings. In April 2019, Bias signed a training camp contract for the New York Liberty. In May 2019, Bias would make the final roster for the team.

Overseas
From 2014 to 2016, Bias played two off-seasons in Hungary for Diósgyőri VTK and won a championship with the team in her second year. As of August 2016, Bias signed a short-term deal to play in Israel for Maccabi Ranana during the 2016-17 WNBA off-season.

International
Bias also plays for the Thailand national women's basketball team.

Personal life 
Bias was born in Wichita, Kansas. She is the daughter of Judy and Francis Bias. Bias also has a sister Cierra and two brothers named Dominique and Trey.  Her mother's side of the family is also originally from Thailand. Outside of basketball, Bias has pursued other ventures such as modelling and clothing design. She's also become a sideline reporter for the Dallas Mavericks.

References

External links
Oklahoma State bio

1992 births
Living people
People from Andover, Kansas
Basketball players from Wichita, Kansas
American women's basketball players
Tiffany Bias
American expatriate basketball people in Hungary
American expatriate basketball people in Thailand
Competitors at the 2019 Southeast Asian Games
Oklahoma State Cowgirls basketball players
American people of Thai descent
Tiffany Bias
American emigrants to Thailand
Tiffany Bias
Phoenix Mercury draft picks
Phoenix Mercury players
Dallas Wings players
New York Liberty players
Point guards
Southeast Asian Games medalists in basketball
Tiffany Bias